Bonners Ferry High School is a four-year public secondary school in Bonners Ferry, Idaho. The only traditional high school in the Boundary County School District #101, it serves all of Boundary County, the northernmost in the state. The approximately 500 students come from an area larger than the state of Rhode Island. The school colors are navy blue and white and the mascot is a badger.

Athletics
Bonners Ferry competes in athletics in IHSAA Class 3A and is a member of the Intermountain League with Kellogg, Priest River, and Timberlake in Spirit Lake. The school has an American Football team, which won a trophy in 1975 The school also operates soccer and baseball teams, as well as the schools most successful athletic program, wrestling.

References

External links

MaxPreps.com - Bonners Ferry Badgers
Boundary County School District #101

Public high schools in Idaho
Schools in Boundary County, Idaho